Sirima Ratwatte Dias Bandaranaike (17 April 191610 October 2000), commonly known as Sirimavo Bandaranaike (මැතිනිය), was a Sri Lankan politician. She was the world's first female prime minister when she became Prime Minister of Sri Lanka (then the Dominion of Ceylon) in 1960. She chaired the Sri Lanka Freedom Party from 1960 to 1994 and served three terms as prime minister, two times as the chief executive, 1960 to 1965 and 1970 to 1977, and once again in a presidential system from 1994 to 2000, governing under the presidency of her daughter Chandrika Kumaratunga.

Born into a Sinhalese Kandyan aristocratic family, Bandaranaike was educated in Catholic, English-medium schools, but remained a Buddhist and spoke Sinhala as well as English. On graduating from secondary school, she worked for various social programmes before marrying and raising a family. Playing hostess to her husband S. W. R. D. Bandaranaike, who founded the socialist Sri Lanka Freedom Party in 1951 and became prime minister in 1956, she gained his trust as an informal advisor. Her social work focused on improving the lives of women and girls in rural areas of Sri Lanka. 

Following her husband's assassination in 1959, Bandaranaike was soon persuaded by the party leadership during a brief time in opposition to enter politics herself and succeed her husband as chairwoman; she returned her party to the government and defeated prime minister Dudley Senanayake's UNP in the July 1960 election. She was then unseated by Senanayake in the 1965 election and became Leader of the Opposition, before winning a large majority in 1970 due to a cleverly structured election alliance with rival Marxist parties.

Bandaranaike attempted to reform the former British colony of Ceylon into a socialist republic by nationalising organisations in the banking, education, industry, media and trade sectors. Changing the administrative language from English to Sinhala and routinely campaigning on Sinhalese nationalist and anti-Tamil policies, which was political mainstream, she exacerbated discontent among the native Tamil population, and with the estate Tamils, who had become stateless under the Citizenship Act of 1948. 

During Bandaranaike's first two terms as prime minister, the country was plagued by high inflation and taxes, a dependence on food imports to feed the populace, high unemployment, and polarisation between the Sinhalese and Tamil populations because of her Sinhalese nationalist policies. Surviving an attempted coup d'état in 1962, as well as a 1971 insurrection of radical youths, in 1972 she oversaw the drafting of a new constitution and the formation of the Sri Lankan republic, separating it from the British Empire and also extending the parliamentary period until 1977. In 1975, Bandaranaike created what would eventually become the Sri Lankan Ministry of Women and Child Affairs, also appointing the first woman to serve in the Sri Lankan Cabinet aside from herself. Bandaranaike's tenure was marked by inadequate economic development at the national level. She played a large role abroad as a negotiator and a leader among the Non-Aligned Nations.

Losing against J. R. Jayewardene in a colossal landslide in the 1977 election and as the UNP government greatly reduced democratic rights, Bandaranaike was stripped of her civil rights in 1980 for claimed abuses of power during her tenure and barred from government for seven years, making her ineligible for the 1982 presidential election in the new presidential system. The new government initially improved the domestic economy, but failed to address social issues, and led the country into a protracted civil war against Tamil militants, which escalated in brutality over the years, especially when the Indian Peace Keeping Force was allowed to intervene. When she was allowed to return as a public figure in 1986, Bandaranaike opposed the Indian intervention, believing it violated Sri Lankan sovereignty. 

Failing to win the office of President against new UNP leader Ranasinghe Premadasa in 1988, she restored her party, which had by now developed more centrist policies and advocated for a reconciliatory approach towards Tamils in the civil war, as a relevant force in the first parliamentary election after 12 years and served a second time as Leader of the Opposition from 1989 to 1994. When her daughter, who succeeded her as party leader, won the 1994 presidential election, Bandaranaike was appointed to her third term as prime minister and served until her retirement in 2000, two months prior to her death.

Early life (1916–1940) 

Bandaranaike was born Sirima Ratwatte on 17 April 1916 at Ellawala Walawwa, her aunt's residence in Ratnapura, in British Ceylon. Her mother was Rosalind Hilda Mahawalatenne Kumarihamy, an informal Ayurvedic physician, and her father was Barnes Ratwatte, a native headman and politician. Her maternal grandfather Mahawalatenne, and later her father, served as Rate Mahatmaya, a native headman, of Balangoda. Her father was a member of the Radala Ratwatte family, chieftains of the Kingdom of Kandy. Her paternal ancestry included her uncle Sir Jayatilaka Cudah Ratwatte, the first person from Kandy to receive a British knighthood, as well as courtiers serving Sinhalese monarchs. One of these, Ratwatte, Dissawa of Matale, was a signatory of the 1815 Kandyan Convention.

Sirima was the eldest in a family of six children. She had four brothers, Barnes Jr., Seevali, Mackie, and Clifford, and one sister, Patricia, who married Colonel Edward James Divitotawela, founder of the Central Command of the Ceylon Army. The family resided at the walawwa, or colonial manor house, of Sirima's maternal grandfather Mahawalatenne, and then later at their own walawwa in Balangoda. From a young age, Sirima had access to her grandfather's vast library of literary and scientific works. She first attended a private kindergarten in Balangoda, moved briefly in 1923 to the primary classes of Ferguson High School in Ratnapura, and was then sent to boarding school at St Bridget's Convent, Colombo. Though her education was in the Catholic school system, Sirima remained a practising Buddhist throughout her life and was fluent in both English and Sinhala. 

After completing her schooling at age 19, Sirima Ratwatte became involved in social work, distributing food and medicine to jungle villages, organising clinics and helping create rural industry to improve the living standards of village women. She became the treasurer of the Social Service League, serving in that capacity until 1940. Over the next six years, she lived with her parents while they arranged her marriage. After rejecting two suitors – a relative, and the son of the first family of Ceylon – Ratwatte's parents were contacted by a matchmaker who proposed a union with Solomon West Ridgeway Dias (S.W.R.D.) Bandaranaike, an Oxford-educated lawyer-turned-politician, who was at the time Minister of Local Administration in the State Council of Ceylon. Initially, S.W.R.D. Bandaranaike was not considered to be from an "acceptable" family, as the Ratwattes were an aristocratic Kandyan family, which had inherited their service to the traditional royal family, while the Bandaranaikes were a wealthy family from the low-country, which had been in service of the colonial rulers for centuries. Astrologers reported their horoscopes were compatible, the benefits of uniting the families was weighed, and approval was given by the Ratwatte family. The couple, who had previously met, were in agreement with the choice.

Raising a family, social work (1940–1959) 

On 2 October 1940, Ratwatte and Bandaranaike married at the Mahawelatenne Walawwa in what was dubbed "the wedding of the century" by the press for its grandeur. The newly married couple moved into Wendtworth in Colombo's Guildford Crescent, which they rented from Lionel Wendt. Their daughters, Sunethra (1943) and Chandrika (1945), were born at Wendtworth where the family lived until 1946, when S.W.R.D.'s father bought them a mansion known as Tintagel at Rosmead Place in Colombo. 

From this point onward, the family lived part of the year at Tintagel and part of the year at S.W.R.D.'s ancestral manor, Horagolla Walawwa. A son, Anura was born at Tintagel in 1949. Over the next 20 years, Sirima Bandaranaike devoted most of her time to raising her family and playing hostess to her husband's many political acquaintances. 

All three of Bandarnaike's children were educated abroad. Sunetra studied at Oxford, Chandrika at the University of Paris, and Anura at the University of London. All would later return and serve in the Sri Lankan government.

In 1941 Bandaranaike joined the Lanka Mahila Samiti (Lankan Women's Association), the country's largest women's voluntary organisation. She participated in many of the social projects initiated by the Mahila Samiti for the empowerment of rural women and disaster relief. One of her first projects was an agricultural programme to meet food production shortages. Her first office, as secretary of the organisation, involved meeting with farming experts to develop new methods for producing yields of rice crops. Over time, Bandaranaike served as the treasurer, vice-president, and eventually president of Mahila Samiti, focusing on issues of girls' education, women's political rights, and family planning. She was also a member of the All Ceylon Buddhist Women's Association, the Cancer Society, the Ceylon National Association for the Prevention of Tuberculosis, and the Nurses Welfare Association.

Bandaranaike often accompanied S.W.R.D. on official trips, both locally and abroad. She and her husband were both present after the psychiatric hospital in Angoda was bombed by the Japanese during the Easter Sunday Raid in 1942, killing many. As Ceylon moved toward self-governing status in 1947, S.W.R.D. became more active in the nationalist movement. He ran for – and was elected to – the House of Representatives from the Attanagalla Electoral District. He was appointed Minister of Health and served as Leader of the House, but became increasingly frustrated with the inner workings and policies of the United National Party. Though he did not encourage Bandaranaike to engage on political topics and was dismissive of her in front of colleagues, S.W.R.D. came to respect her judgment. 

In 1951, she persuaded him to resign from the United National Party and establish the Sri Lanka Freedom Party (Freedom Party, aka SLFP). Bandaranaike campaigned in S.W.R.D.'s Attanagalla constituency during the 1952 parliamentary election, while he travelled around the country to garner support. Though the Freedom Party won only nine seats during that election, S.W.R.D. was elected to Parliament and became Leader of the Opposition.

When fresh elections were called in 1956 by Prime Minister Sir John Kotelawala, S.W.R.D. sensed an opportunity and formed the Mahajana Eksath Peramuna (MEP), a broad four-party coalition, to contest the 1956 elections. Bandaranaike once again campaigned for her husband in Attanagalla, in her home town of Balangoda, and in Ratnapura for the Freedom Party. The Mahajana Eksath Peramuna won a landslide victory and S.W.R.D. became the Prime Minister. 

While on a state visit to Malaysia on its Independence in 1957, the couple had to cut short their stay when they received news that Bandaranaike's father was gravely ill following a heart attack. He died two weeks after their hasty return.

Bandaranaike was at home in Rosmead Place on the morning of 25 September 1959, when S.W.R.D. Bandaranaike was shot multiple times by a Buddhist monk, disgruntled over what he believed to be lack of support for traditional medicine. Bandaranaike accompanied her husband to hospital, where he succumbed to his wounds the following day. 

In the political chaos that followed under the caretaker government of Wijeyananda Dahanayake, many cabinet ministers were removed, and some were arrested and tried for the assassination. The Mahajana Eksath Peramuna coalition collapsed without S.W.R.D.'s influence, and elections were called for March 1960 to fill the seat for the Attanagalla constituency. Bandaranaike reluctantly agreed to run as an independent candidate, but before the election could be held, Parliament was dissolved, and she decided not to contest the seat. When the election was held in March 1960, the United National Party won a four-seat majority over the Sri Lanka Freedom Party. Dudley Senanayake, the new Prime Minister, was defeated within a month in a vote of confidence and a second general election was called for July 1960.

Political career 

In May 1960, Bandaranaike was unanimously elected party president by the executive committee of the Freedom Party, although at the time she was still undecided about running in the July election. Disavowing former party ties with Communists and Trotskyists, by early June she was campaigning with promises to carry forward the policies of her husband – in particular, establishing a republic, enacting a law to establish Sinhala as the official language of the country, and recognising the predominance of Buddhism, though tolerating the estate Tamils' use of their own language and Hindu faith. 

Though there had been Tamil populations in the country for centuries, the majority of the estate Tamils had been brought to Ceylon from India by the British authorities as plantation workers. Many Ceylonese viewed them as temporary immigrants, even though they had lived for generations in Ceylon. With Ceylon's independence, the Citizenship Act of 1948 excluded these Indian Tamils from citizenship, making them stateless. S.W.R.D.'s policy toward the stateless Tamils had been moderate, granting some citizenship and allowing productive workers to remain. His successor, Dudley Senanayake, was the first to recommend compulsory repatriation for the population. Bandaranaike toured the country and made emotional speeches, frequently bursting into tears as she pledged herself to continue her late husband's policies. Her actions earned her the title "The Weeping Widow" from her opponents.

First female Prime Minister (1960–1965) 

On 21 July 1960, following a landslide victory for the Freedom Party, Bandaranaike was sworn in as the first female prime minister in the world, as well as Minister of Defence and External Affairs. As she was not an elected member of parliament at the time, but leader of the party holding the majority in parliament, the constitution required her to become a member of Parliament within three months if she was to continue holding office as Prime Minister. To make a place for her, Manameldura Piyadasa de Zoysa resigned his seat in the Senate. On 5 August 1960, Governor General Goonetilleke appointed Bandaranaike to the Senate of Ceylon, the upper house of Parliament. 

Initially, she struggled to navigate the issues facing the country, relying on her cabinet member and nephew, Felix Dias Bandaranaike. Opponents made dismissive comments about her "kitchen cabinet": she would continue to face similar sexism while in office.

To further her husband's policy of nationalising key sectors of the economy, Bandaranaike established a corporation with public-private shareholders, taking control of seven newspapers. She nationalised banking, foreign trade, and insurance, as well as the petroleum industry. In taking over the Bank of Ceylon and establishing branches of the newly created People's Bank, Bandaranaike aimed to provide services to communities with no previous banking facilities, spurring local business development. 

In December 1960, Bandaranaike nationalised all the parochial schools that were receiving state funding. In doing so she curtailed the influence of the Catholic minority, who tended to be members of the economic and political elite, and extended the influence of Buddhist groups. 

In January 1961, Bandaranaike implemented a law making Sinhala the official language, replacing English. This action caused wide discontent among the more than two million Tamil-speakers. Urged on by members of the Federal Party, a campaign of civil disobedience began in the provinces with Tamil majorities. Bandaranaike's response was to declare a state of emergency and send in troops to restore peace. 

Beginning in 1961, trade unions began a series of strikes in protest of high inflation and taxes. One such strike immobilised the transport system, motivating Bandaranaike to nationalise the transport board.

In January 1962, conflicts erupted between the established elites: the predominantly right-wing Westernized urban Christians – including large contingents of Burghers and Tamils – and the emerging native elite, who were predominantly leftist Sinhala-speaking Buddhists. The changes caused by Bandaranaike's policies created an immediate shift away from the Anglophilic class system, power structures, and governance, significantly influencing the composition of the officer corps of the civil service, armed forces, and the police. 

Some military officers plotted a coup d'état, which included plans to detain Bandaranaike and her cabinet members at the Army Headquarters. When the police official Stanley Senanayake was taken into the confidence of the coup leadership, his father-in-law Patrick de Silva Kularatne informed the IGP. Immediately calling all service commanders and junior officers to an emergency meeting at Temple Trees, Felix Dias Bandaranaike and members of Criminal Investigation Department (CID) began questioning the military personnel and uncovered the plot. 

Because the coup was aborted before it began, the trial process for the 24 accused conspirators was lengthy and complex. The retroactive Criminal Law Special Provision Act of 1962, which allowed consideration of hearsay evidence, was passed to aid in the conviction of the plotters. Though rumours circulated against Sir Oliver Goonatillake, the governor general, there was no real evidence against him and therefore no means of prosecuting him. He was neither "removed from office nor did he resign". He agreed to answer questions about his suspected involvement once he was replaced. In February Bandaranaike's uncle, William Gopallawa was appointed Governor General. Goonatillake was escorted to the airport, left Ceylon, and went into voluntary exile.

In an attempt to balance east–west interests and maintain neutrality, Bandaranaike strengthened the country's relationship with China, while eliminating ties with Israel. She worked to maintain good relationships with both India and Russia, while keeping ties to British interests through the export of tea and supporting links with the World Bank. Condemning South Africa's apartheid policy, Bandaranaike appointed ambassadors to and sought relationships with other African nations. In 1961, she attended both the Commonwealth Prime Ministers' Conference in London and the Conference on Non-Aligned Nations in Belgrade, Yugoslavia. 

She was a key player in reducing tensions between India and China after their 1962 border dispute erupted into the Sino-Indian War. In November and December of that year, Bandaranaike called conferences in Colombo with delegates from Burma, Cambodia, Ceylon, Ghana and the United Arab Republic to discuss the dispute. She then travelled with Ghanaian Justice Minister Kofi Ofori-Atta to India and Peking, China in an attempt to broker peace. In January 1963, Bandaranaike and Orofi-Atta were rewarded in New Delhi, when Jawaharlal Nehru, the Indian Prime Minister, agreed to make a motion in the Indian Parliament recommending the settlement Bandaranaike had advocated for.

At home, difficulties were mounting. Despite her success abroad, Bandaranaike was criticised for her ties with China and lack of economic development policies. Tensions were still high over the government's apparent favouritism of Sinhala-speaking Ceylonese Buddhists. The import-export imbalance, compounded by inflation, was impacting the buying power of middle- and lower-class citizens. In the mid-year by-election, although Bandaranaike held a majority, the United National Party made gains, indicating that her support was slipping. 

Lack of support for austerity measures, specifically the inability to import adequate rice – the main dietary staple – caused the resignation of Minister Felix Dias Bandaranaike. Other cabinet ministers were reassigned in an attempt to stem the drift toward Soviet trade partnerships, which had gained ground after the creation of the Ceylon Petroleum Corporation. The Petroleum Corporation had been launched in 1961 to bypass the monopolistic pricing imposed on Middle Eastern oil imports, allowing Ceylon to import oil from the United Arab Republic and the Soviet Union. Some of the storage facilities of western oil operatives were co-opted with a compensation agreement, but continuing disputes over non-payment resulted in suspension of foreign aid from the United States in February 1963. In reaction to the suspension of aid, the Parliament passed the Ceylon Petroleum Corporation Amendment Act nationalising all distribution, import-export, sales and supply of most oil products in the country, from January 1964.

Also in 1964, Bandaranaike's government abolished the independent Ceylon Civil Service and replaced it with the Ceylon Administrative Service, which was subject to government influence. When the United Left Front coalition between the Communist, Revolutionary Socialist and Trotskyist Parties was formed in late 1963, Bandaranaike moved left to try to gain their support. In February 1964, Chinese Premier Zhou Enlai visited Bandaranaike in Ceylon with offers of aid, gifts of rice and textiles, and discussions to extend trade. The two also discussed the Sino-Indian border dispute and nuclear disarmament. The ties with China were attractive, as Bandaranaike's recent formal recognition of East Germany had eliminated incoming aid from West Germany and her nationalisation of the insurance industry had impacted her relationships with Australia, Britain and Canada. 

In preparation for the second Non-Aligned Conference, Bandaranaike hosted presidents Tito and Nasser in Colombo in March 1964, but continued domestic unrest caused her to suspend parliamentary sessions until July. In the interim, she entered into a coalition with the United Left Front and was able to shore up her majority, though only by a margin of three seats.

In September 1964 Bandaranaike led a delegation to India to discuss the repatriation of the 975,000 stateless Tamils residing in Ceylon. Along with Indian Prime Minister Lal Bahadur Shastri, she ironed out the terms of the Srimavo-Shastri Pact, a landmark agreement for the foreign policy of both nations. Under the agreement, Ceylon was to grant citizenship to 300,000 of the Tamils and their descendants while India was to repatriate 525,000 stateless Tamils. During the 15 years allotted to complete their obligations, the parties agreed to negotiate terms for the remaining 150,000. In October, Bandaranaike attended and co-sponsored the Non-Aligned Conference held in Cairo. 

In December 1964, her United Front government put forward the "Press Take Over Bill" in an attempt to nationalise the country's newspapers. The opposition and Bandaranaike's critiques claimed that the move was to muzzle a free press and strike at her major critic, the Lake House Group led by the press baron Esmond Wickremesinghe. Wickremesinghe responded with a campaign to remove her from office to safeguard the freedom of the press. On 3 December 1964, C. P. de Silva, who was at one time S. W. R. D. Bandaranaike's deputy, led thirteen SLFP parliamentarians and crossed over to the opposition citing the Press Take Over Bill. The government of Sirima Bandaranaike lost the throne speech by one vote and a general election was called for in March 1965. Her political coalition was defeated in the 1965 elections, ending her first term as Prime Minister.

Leader of the opposition (1965–1970) 
In the 1965 elections, Bandaranaike won a seat in the House of Representatives from the Attanagalla Electoral District. With her party gaining 41 seats, she became the Leader of the Opposition, the first woman ever to hold the post. Dudley Senanayake was sworn in as Prime Minister on 25 March 1965. 

Soon after, Bandaranaike's position as a member of parliament was challenged, when allegations were made that she had accepted a bribe, in the form of a car, while in office. A committee was appointed to investigate and she was later cleared of the charge. 

During her five-year term in the opposition, she maintained her alliance with leftist parties. Of the seven by-elections held between November 1966 and April 1967, six were won by the opposition under Bandaranaike's leadership. Continued inflation, trade imbalance, unemployment, and the failure of expected foreign aid to materialise led to widespread discontent. This was further fuelled by austerity measures, which reduced the weekly rice stipend. By 1969, Bandaranaike was actively campaigning to return to power. Among other pledges, she promised to give two measures of rice per household, nationalise foreign banks and the import-export industry, establish watchgroups for monitoring business and government corruption, return to a foreign policy which leaned away from "imperialist" partners, and hold a Constituent Assembly charged with drafting a new Constitution.

Second term (1970–1977)

Bandaranaike regained power after the United Front coalition between the Communist Party, the Lanka Sama Samaja Party and her own Freedom Party won the 1970 elections with a large majority in May 1970. By July, she had convened a Constitutional Assembly to replace the British-drafted constitution with one drafted by the Ceylonese. She introduced policies requiring that permanent secretaries in the government ministries have expertise in their division. For example, those serving in the Ministry of Housing had to be trained engineers, and those serving in the Ministry of Health, medical practitioners. All government employees were allowed to join Workers Councils and at the local level and she established People's Committees to allow input from the population at large on government administration. The changes were intended to remove elements of British colonial and foreign influence from the country's institutions.

Facing budget deficits of $195 million – caused by rising energy and food-importation costs and declining revenue from coconut, rubber and tea exports – Bandaranaike attempted to centralise the economy and implement price controls. Pressed by the leftist members of her coalition to nationalise the foreign banks of British, Indian and Pakistani origin, she realised that doing so would impact the need for credit. As she had in her previous regime, she tried to balance the flow of foreign assistance from both capitalist and communist partners. 

In September 1970, Bandaranaike attended the third Non-Aligned Conference in Lusaka, Zambia. That month, she also travelled to Paris and London to discuss international trade. Ordering representatives of The Asia Foundation and the Peace Corps to leave the country, Bandaranaike began re-evaluating trade agreements and proposals that had been negotiated by her predecessor. She announced that her government would not recognise Israel until the country peacefully settled its problem with its Arab neighbours. She officially granted recognition to East Germany, North Korea, North Vietnam, and the National Liberation Front of South Vietnam. Bandaranaike opposed the development of an Anglo-US communications centre in the Indian Ocean, maintaining that the area should be a "neutral, nuclear-free zone". In December, the Business Undertaking Acquisition Act was passed, allowing the state to nationalise any business with more than 100 employees. Ostensibly, the move aimed to reduce foreign control of key tea and rubber production, but it stunted both domestic and foreign investment in industry and development.

Despite Bandaranaike's efforts to address the country's economic problems, unemployment and inflation remained unchecked. After just 16 months in power, Bandaranaike's government was almost toppled by the 1971 Janatha Vimukthi Peramuna Insurrection of left-wing youths. Though aware of the militant stance of the Janatha Vimukthi Peramuna (People's Liberation Front), Bandaranaike's administration initially failed to recognise them as an imminent threat, dismissing them as idealists. 

On 6 March, militants attacked the U.S. Embassy in Colombo, leading to the declaration of a state of emergency on 17 March. In early April, attacks on police stations evidenced a well-planned insurgency which Ceylon's small army was ill-equipped to handle. Calling on its allies for assistance, the government was saved largely because of Bandaranaike's neutral foreign policy. The Soviet Union sent aircraft to support the Ceylonese government; arms and equipment came from Britain, the United Arab Republic, the United States and Yugoslavia; medical supplies were provided by East and West Germany, Norway and Poland; patrol boats were sent from India; and both India and Pakistan sent troops. On 1 May, Bandaranaike suspended government offensives and offered an amnesty, which resulted in thousands of surrenders. The following month a second amnesty was offered. Bandaranaike established a National Committee of Reconstruction to re-establish civil authority and provide a strategic plan for dealing with those captured or surrendered insurgents. One of the Bandaranaike's first actions after the conflict was to expel North Korean diplomats, as she suspected they had fomented the radical discontent. The saying "She was the only man in her cabinet" – attributed to her political opponents in the 1960s –  resurfaced during the height of the insurgency, as Bandaranaike proved that she had become a "formidable political force". 

In May 1972, Ceylon was replaced by the Republic of Sri Lanka after a new Constitution was ratified. Though the country remained within the Commonwealth of Nations, Queen Elizabeth II was no longer recognised as its sovereign. Under its terms, the Senate, suspended since 1971, was officially abolished and the new unicameral National State Assembly was created, combining the powers of the executive, judicial and legislative branches in one authority. 

The constitution recognised the supremacy of Buddhism, though it guaranteed equal protection to Buddhism, Christianity, Hinduism, and Islam. It failed to provide a charter of inalienable rights, recognised Sinhala as the only official language, and contained no "elements of federalism". 

The new constitution also extended Bandaranaike's term by two years, resetting the mandated five-year term of the Prime Minister to the coincide with the creation of the republic. These limits caused concern for various sectors of the population, specifically those who were uneasy about authoritarian rule, and the Tamil-speaking population. Before the month was out, the discontent escalated before leading to the passage of the Justices Commission Bill, establishing separate tribunals to deal with the imprisoned insurgents from the previous year. Those in opposition to the tribunals argued that they were a violation of the principles of human rights. By July, sporadic incidents of violence were resurfacing, and by the end of the year, a second wave of revolt was anticipated. Widespread unemployment fuelled the public's growing disillusionment with the government, in spite of land redistribution programmes enacted to establish farming cooperatives and limit the size of privately held lands. 

In 1972, Bandaranaike introduced major land reforms in Sri Lanka, with the enactment of the Land Reform Act of No. 01 of 1972 which imposed a ceiling of twenty hectares on privately owned land, this was later followed up by the Land Reform (Amendment) Act in 1975 that nationalized plantations owned by public companies. The objective of these land reforms were to grant lands to landless peasants. Critiques claimed that the second wave of reforms were targeted the wealthy landowners that had traditionally supported the United National Party. As a result of these reforms the state became the largest plantation owner and two entities, the Sri Lanka State Plantations Corporation, the Janatha Estate Development Board (People's Estate Development Board) and the USAWASAMA (Upcountry Cooperative Estate Development Board) were established to manage these estates. In the years following these land reforms, the production of the key export crops which Sri Lanka depended on for the in follow of foreign currency dropped.

The 1973 oil crisis had a traumatic effect on the Sri Lankan economy. Still dependent on foreign assistance, goods and monetary aid from Australia, Canada, China, Denmark, Hungary, and the World Bank, Bandaranaike eased the austerity programmes that limited importation of consumer goods. The United States terminated aid grants, which required no repayment, and changed to a policy of providing foreign loans. Devaluation of the Sri Lankan currency, coupled with inflation and high taxes, slowed economic growth, consequently creating cyclical pressure to address deficits with even higher taxes and austerity measures. Uncontrolled inflation between 1973 and 1974 led to economic uncertainty and public dissatisfaction. 

In 1974, Bandaranaike forced the shut-down of the last independent newspaper group, The Sun, believing their criticism was fuelling unrest. Fissures appeared in the United Front coalition, largely resulting from the Lanka Sama Samaja Party's continued influence on trade unions and threats of strike actions throughout 1974 and 1975. When newly confiscated estates were placed under the Ministry of Agriculture and Lands, controlled by the Lanka Sama Samaja Party, fears that they would unionise plantation workers led Bandaranaike to oust them from the government coalition.

In recognition of International Women's Year in 1975, Bandaranaike created an agency to focus on women's issues, which would later become the Ministry of Women and Child Affairs. She appointed the first woman to serve in the Sri Lankan Cabinet, Siva Obeyesekere, first as First State Secretary for Health and later as Minister of Health. She was feted at the UN World Conference on Women hosted in Mexico City, attending as the only woman Prime Minister elected in her own right. Bandaranaike stepped into the one-year term of chair at the 5th Conference of the Non-Aligned Nations in 1976, hosting the meeting in Colombo. 

Despite her high regard internationally, she continued to struggle domestically under allegations of corruption and nepotism, while the economy continued to decline. In their struggle for recognition, discontented Tamils turned to separatism. In May 1976, the Vaddukoddai Resolution was adopted by the Tamil United Liberation Front, calling for independent statehood and sovereign autonomy. In the 1977 general elections, the United Front was soundly defeated, winning only six seats.

Party leader (1977–1988)
Bandaranaike retained her parliamentary seat in Attanagalla in the 1977 general elections. In November 1977, a petition challenging her position as a member of parliament was dismissed by the Colombo High Court. In 1978, a new constitution was ratified, replacing the British-style parliamentary system with a French-style presidential system. Under the constitution, the executive or President, was elected by a vote of the people to serve a six-year term. The president then chose a Prime Minister to preside over the Cabinet, who was confirmed by the legislature. Providing a declaration of fundamental rights, guaranteeing the equality of citizens for the first time, it also recognised Tamil as a national language, though the administrative language remained Sinhala. Though aimed at appeasing Tamil separatists, the provisions did not stop the violence between Tamils and Sinhalese, resulting in the passage of the 1979 Prevention of Terrorism Act.

In 1980, a Special Presidential Commission was appointed by President J. R. Jayawardene to investigate allegations against Bandaranaike for abuses of power during her tenure as Prime Minister. Following the submission of the report to Jayawardene, the United National Party government adopted a motion in parliament on 16 October 1980 to strip Bandaranaike and her nephew, Felix Dias Bandaranaike – who was convicted of corruption – of their civil liberties for a period of seven years. She was expelled from parliament, but maintained her role as party leader. The motion passed by 139 votes in favour and 18 against, easily meeting the required two-thirds threshold. 

Despite being its head, Bandaranaike was unable to campaign for the Freedom Party. As a result, her son, Anura served as the parliamentary party leader. Under Anura the Freedom Party moved to the right, and Bandaranaike's daughter, Chandrika, withdrew, forming the Sri Lanka People's Party with her husband, Vijaya Kumaratunga. The goals of the new party were related to rapprochement with the Tamils.

From 1980, conflict between the government and separatists of various competing groups, including the Tamil Tigers, the People's Liberation Organisation of Tamil Eelam, the Tamil Eelam Liberation Army, and the Tamil Eelam Liberation Organization, became more frequent and increasingly violent. During local election campaigning in 1981, Tamil extremists assassinated Arumugam Thiagarajah, a prominent United National Party politician. The Tamil United Liberation Front Party called for a boycott of the 1982 presidential elections. Insurgents supported the ban, as they contended that co-operation with the government legitimised its policies and conflicted with the desire for attaining an independent Tamil state. 

In 1983 insurgent Tamils ambushed an army patrol, killing thirteen soldiers. Retaliatory violence by Sinhalese mobs sparked riots against non-insurgent Tamils and their property throughout the country, later referred to as Black July.

Jayewardene's move towards free markets and a focus on economic growth hurt Tamil farmers in the north by removing trade protections. Similarly, the policies negatively impacted not only southern Sinhalese businesses facing competition from Indian markets, but also the urban poor, whose food subsidies were greatly reduced. Massive government spending for economic development created budget deficits and inflation, alarming the World Bank and International Monetary Fund administrators. In turn, donor agencies reduced aid to persuade the government to control spending. Acceleration of the Mahaweli Development programme increased employment and stabilised the food supply, also reducing dependence on foreign energy supplies with the completion of four hydropower-generating facilities. 

The focus on building the economy and infrastructure failed to address social issues. For example, the rural housing initiative – which built some 100,000 new homes by 1984 – polarised communities because housing was distributed by political alliance rather than need. Privatization of industry, after 1982, created significant gaps between the rich and poor and inflation returned, making goods hard to procure and lowering the standard of living.

In January 1986, Bandaranaike's civil rights were restored by a presidential decree issued by Jayewardene. The conflict between the government and the separatists, which had escalated since 1983, morphed into a Civil War by 1987. 

Jayewardene showed little sympathy for the issues of concern to the Tamils and instead blamed the unrest on left-wing factions plotting a government overthrow. Breakdowns in negotiations with the rebels eventually led Jayewardene to authorise the intervention of the Indian Government. Signed in 1987, The Indo-Sri Lanka Accord laid out terms of the truce between the Sri Lankan Government and the rebels, authorising the Indian Peace Keeping Force to occupy the country in an attempt to promote disarmament. 

Bandaranaike and the Freedom Party opposed the introduction of Indian troops, believing the government had betrayed its own people by allowing India to intervene on behalf of the Tamils. As a reaction to state-sanctioned violence and their desire for nationalist focus, the Janatha Vimukthi Peramuna militants re-emerged in the south. Against this backdrop, Bandaranaike decided to run in the 1988 presidential election. She was narrowly defeated by Ranasinghe Premadasa, who succeeded Jayewardene as president.

Leader of the opposition (1989–1994)

On 6 February 1989, while campaigning for the Freedom Party in the 1989 general election, Bandaranaike survived a bombing attack. Though she was unscathed, one of her aides suffered leg injuries. In the final results on the 19th, the Freedom Party was defeated by the United National Party under Ranasinghe Premadasa, but gained 67 seats, sufficient for Bandaranaike to take up the post of Leader of the Opposition for a second term. She was successfully re-elected to parliament in the Gampaha Electoral District. The same year, the government crushed the Janatha Vimukthi Peramuna rebels, killing some 30,000 to 70,000 of them, rather than opting for trials or imprisonment as Bandaranaike had done in 1971.

In 1990, when the 13-month ceasefire was broken by the Tamil Tigers, after other militias surrendered their weapons, the government decided to break off negotiations with the Tigers and employ a military solution. Anura supported the move, but his mother, Bandaranaike, spoke against the plan. When emergency powers were assumed by the president, she demanded that the state of emergency be lifted, accusing the government of human rights abuses.

During her tenure as opposition leader, she supported the impeachment of Premadasa in 1991, which was led by senior United National Party members such as Lalith Athulathmudali and Gamini Dissanayake. The impeachment failed, as Premadasa adjourned Parliament and the Speaker M. H. Mohamed dismissed the motion for impeachment, stating there were not enough signatures supporting it. Bandaranaike's daughter Chandrika Kumaratunga, who had been living in self-imposed exile in London since 1988, when her husband had been assassinated, returned to Sri Lanka and rejoined the Freedom Party in 1991. In the same year, Bandaranaike, who was increasingly impaired by arthritis, suffered a stroke.

In 1992, Premadasa Udugampola, head of the Bureau of Special Operations, was forced to retire after an international outcry over human rights abuse surfaced. Udugampola provided a written statement that the death squads used against rebels had been backed by the government. Bandaranaike came out in support of his evidence, but Udugampola was charged for cultivating public hostility against the government. When President Premadasa was assassinated by a suicide bomber on 1 May 1993, his Prime Minister Dingiri Banda Wijetunga was sworn as acting president and nominated to complete the president's unexpired term until 2 January 1995. The members of Parliament were required to vote on the succession within a month. Due to her failing health, Bandaranaike chose not to run for the presidency, but to continue as opposition leader, and Wijetunga ran unopposed.

Wijetunga convinced Bandaranaike's son, Anura, to defect to the United National Party and rewarded him with an appointment as Minister of Higher Education. His defection left Bandaranaike and Kumaratunga in charge of the Freedom Party. Due to her mother's declining health, Kumaratunga led the formation of a new coalition, the People's Alliance (PA), to contest the 1993 provincial election in the Western Province of Sri Lanka in May. The alliance won a landslide victory, and Kumaratunga was appointed as the chief minister in 1993. Subsequently, the coalition led by Kumaratunga also won the southern provincial council elections. Kumaratunga led the People's Alliance campaign for the 1994 parliamentary election, as her mother was recovering from surgery. The Alliance won a decisive victory, and Bandaranaike announced that Kumaratunga would become Prime Minister. By this time Kumaratunga had also succeeded her as the leader of the Freedom Party. Mentally alert but suffering from a foot ailment and complications from diabetes, Bandaranaike was confined to a wheelchair. Having been re-elected to parliament, she was appointed to her daughter's cabinet as a Minister without Portfolio at the swearing-in ceremony held on 19 August 1994.

Third term (1994–2000)
In the presidential election that followed in November, Kumaratunga's main political rival, Gamini Dissanayake, was assassinated two weeks before the election. His widow, Srima Dissanayake, was chosen as the United National Party's presidential candidate. Kumaratunga's lead was predicted to be around a million votes even before the assassination; she won the election by a wide margin. Becoming the first female President of Sri Lanka, Kumaratunga appointed her mother as prime minister, which under the terms of the 1978 constitution meant Bandaranaike was responsible for defence and foreign affairs. Though the office of prime minister had become mainly a ceremonial post, Bandaranaike's influence in the Freedom Party remained strong. While they agreed on policy, Kumaratunga and Bandaranaike differed on leadership style. By 2000, Kumaratunga wanted a younger prime minister, and Bandaranaike, citing health reasons, stepped down in August 2000.

Death and legacy

Bandaranaike died on 10 October 2000 of a heart attack at Kadawatha, as she was heading home to Colombo. She had been casting her vote in the parliamentary election, which had been held that day. Sri Lanka declared two days of national mourning, and state radio stations abandoned their regular programming to play funereal laments. Bandaranaike's remains lay in state in the parliament, and her funeral subsequently took place at Horagolla, where she was interred in the mausoleum, Horagolla Bandaranaike Samadhi, originally built for her husband.

At a time in history when the idea of a woman leading a country was almost unthinkable to the public, Bandaranaike helped raise the global perception of women's capabilities. In addition to her own contributions to Sri Lanka, her children became involved in the development of the country. All three children held nationally prominent positions; in addition to Anura and Chandrika's roles in government, Bandaranaike's daughter Sunetra worked as her political secretary in the 1970s and later became a philanthropist. The Bandaranaike marriage helped break down social barriers in Sri Lanka over the years, through the Socialist policies they enacted.

During her three terms in office, Bandaranaike led the country away from its colonial past and into its political independence as a republic. Implementing socialist policies during the Cold War, she attempted to nationalise key sectors of the economy and undertake land reforms to benefit the native population, desiring to end the political favouritism enjoyed by the Western-educated elites. A major goal of her policies was to reduce the ethnic and socio-economic disparities in the country, though her failure to address adequately the needs of the Tamil population led to decades of strife and violence in the country. As one of the founders of the Non-Aligned Movement, Bandaranaike brought Sri Lanka to prominence among the nations which sought to remain neutral to the influence of the superpowers. She worked to forge alliances between the countries in the Global South, and sought to resolve issues diplomatically, opposing nuclear expansion.

Despite Bandaranaike's notability as the world's first woman prime minister, political scholars have commented that Bandaranaike was symbolically powerful, but ultimately had little impact on women's political representation in Sri Lanka. Although Bandaranaike expressed pride in her status as a woman leader, considering herself a "Mother of the People", she did not place much personal or political emphasis on women's issues, and her election as prime minister did not significantly increase the number of women in Sri Lankan politics. Her appointment of the first woman minister, Siva Obeyesekere, to the Sri Lankan Cabinet in 1976, was less than revolutionary due to the fact that Obeyesekere was a relative of Bandaranaike's. That appointment followed a pattern of Bandaranaike appointing family members to high government positions.

By 1994, even though Bandaranaike and her daughter Kumaratunga held the top political positions of prime minister and president, Sri Lanka continued to have some of the lowest political participation rates for women out of any Asian country. In 2010, on the 50th anniversary of Bandaranaike's election as the world's first female prime minister, Sri Lankan parliamentarian Rosy Senanayake told the press that Sri Lanka had not made significant progress towards gender equality in politics: only 4.5 per cent of parliamentarians were women. Senanayake had earlier called for a "special quota" to achieve better gender representation: such a quota, reserving 25% of all legislative seats for women, was passed in 2016.

Electoral history

Notes

References

Citations

Bibliography

External links
The Ratwatte Ancestry
The Bandaranaike Ancestry

|-

|-

 

1916 births
2000 deaths
20th-century Sri Lankan women politicians
21st-century Sri Lankan women politicians
20th-century women rulers
Alumni of St. Bridget's Convent, Colombo
Sirimavo
Sirimavo
Defence ministers of Sri Lanka
Asian democratic socialists
Female defence ministers
Female foreign ministers
Leaders of the Opposition (Sri Lanka)
Members of the 6th Parliament of Ceylon
Members of the 7th Parliament of Ceylon
Members of the 8th Parliament of Sri Lanka
Members of the 9th Parliament of Sri Lanka
Members of the 10th Parliament of Sri Lanka
Members of the Senate of Ceylon
People from British Ceylon
Prime Ministers of Sri Lanka
Ratwatte family
Sinhalese politicians
Sri Lankan Buddhists
Sri Lanka Freedom Party politicians
Sri Lankan Theravada Buddhists
Women legislators in Sri Lanka
Women prime ministers
Sri Lankan women diplomats
Sri Lankan social workers
Candidates in the 1988 Sri Lankan presidential election
People of the Sri Lankan Civil War
Indian Peace Keeping Force
Sri Lankan women's rights activists